Ľudovít Dubovský (15 November 1918 – 24 May 1998) was a footballer who played international football for both Slovakia and Czechoslovakia. He played as a striker for OAP Bratislava, Kabel Bratislava and Sokol Ostrava.

References

1918 births
1998 deaths
Slovak footballers
Slovakia international footballers
Czechoslovak footballers
Czechoslovakia international footballers
Dual internationalists (football)
FC Baník Ostrava players
Association football forwards
Footballers from Bratislava